Zenana literally meaning "of the women" or "pertaining to women", in Persian language contextually refers to the part of a house belonging to a Muslim, Sikh, or Hindu family in the Indian subcontinent which is reserved for the women of the household. The zenana are the inner apartments of a house in which the women of the family live. The outer apartments for guests and men are called the mardana. Conceptually in those that practise purdah, it is the equivalent in the Indian subcontinent of the harem.

Christian missionaries were able to gain access to these Indian girls and women through the zenana missions; female missionaries who had been trained as doctors and nurses were able to provide them with health care and also evangelise them in their own homes.

Mughal court life 
Physically, the zenana of the Mughal court consisted of exceptionally luxurious conditions, particularly for princesses and women associated to high-ranking figures. Because of the extreme restrictions placed on access to the women's quarters, very few reliable accounts of their description are available. Still, modern scholars evaluating court records and travelogues contemporary with the Mughal period detail the women's lodgings as offering courtyards, ponds, fountains and gardens. The palaces themselves were decorated with mirrors, paintings and marble. Jahanara, daughter of Shah Jahan and Mumtaz Mahal, famously lived in her own apartment decorated with valuable carpets, and murals of flying angels. Other amenities depicted in illustrations of court life include running water and meticulous gardens.

Resident population 
Rather than being the prison-like space of licentious activity popularized by European imagination (see Orientalism), the zenana functioned as the domain of female members of the household, ranging from wives to concubines to widows, unmarried sisters and cousins, and even further distant relations who were considered dependent kin. In addition to the women of rank, the zenana was populated by attendants of various skill and purpose to provide for the needs of the ladies residing within. All visiting friends, servants, and entertainers were invariably female, down to the highly trained corps of armed women – guards known as urdubegis – assigned to escort and protect the women in the zenana.

Administration 
According to Abu'l-Fazl ibn Mubarak, author of the Akbarnama, the zenana of Akbar the Great at Fatehpur Sikri was home to more than five thousand women, who had each been given her own suite of rooms. The size of the zenana meant that it was a community unto itself, and it thus required systematic administration to maintain; all of these administrators were female. Abu'l Fadl describes the zenana as being divided into sections, with daroghas appointed to tend to the financial and organizational needs of the residents. Other administrative positions included the tehwildar, or accounts officer, responsible for the salaries and financial requests of the inhabitants. Then there were the mahaldars, the female servant of highest authority chosen from within the ranks of the daroghas, who often acted as an intelligence source from the zenana directly to the emperor. The royal  anagas (the Turki language word used at the Mughal court for wetnurses), were elevated to positions of rank, though their purpose was not strictly administrative.

Political influence 
It was because male members of Mughal society did not closely define the concept of purdah as a reflection of their own honor that wives, daughters, and particularly unmarried women in the upper-echelons of the empire were able to extend their influence beyond the physical structures of the zenana. That less-constrictive interpretation of purdah allowed the ladies of the Mughal court to indirectly participate in public life, most notably in civic building projects. Jahanara herself was responsible for the major alteration of Shahjahanabad, by constructing the now famous Chandni Chowk market in Old Delhi. Altogether, wives, daughters, and even a courtesan were the primary patrons to 19 major structures in the city. Owing to the cultural precedent set by their Timurid ancestors, it was comparatively more acceptable for Mughal women to perform civic charity in the form of building projects and even engage in leisure activities outside the zenana like hunting, polo and pilgrimage, than it would have been for their Safavid contemporaries. Nur Jahan seems to be unique in that she had a particular affinity for hunting, and was able to gain permission to accompany her husband Jahangir on several outings, even once killing four tigers easily with her excellent marksmanship.

Adherence to purdah 
Despite the social freedom that came with being a member of the royal household, Mughal women did not go about unveiled and were not seen by outsiders or men other than their family. Instead, when they traveled they covered their heads and faces in white veils, and they were transported in howdahs, chaudoles, carriages and palanquins with covering on all sides, to maintain the modesty and seclusion required of purdah. When entering or exiting the zenana itself, female pall bearers carried their palanquins, and they were only transferred to male servants and eunuchs outside the walls of the zenana. Should outsiders be required to enter the zenana, as in the case of an illness where the lady could not be moved for her health, the visitor was covered from head to foot in a shroud and led blindly to the lady by a eunuch escort.

See also

Andaruni

References

External links
 
 

Pakistani culture
Bangladeshi culture
Islam in India
Islam in Pakistan
Islam in Bangladesh
Islamic architectural elements
Purdah
Mughal architecture elements
Sex segregation and Islam
Women's quarters
Zenana missions